An adornment is generally an accessory or ornament worn to enhance the beauty or status of the wearer. They are often worn to embellish, enhance, or distinguish the wearer, and to define cultural, social, or religious status within a specific community. When worn to show economic status, the items are often either rare or prohibitively expensive to others. Adornments are usually colourful, and worn to attract attention.

They have a long history, around the world, from feathers or bone, to modern accessories, such as jewellery. Items of adornment are also used by warriors, and by other members of the military to show rank or achievement.

Items of adornment
These include cosmetics, jewellery, clothing accessories, facial hair, fingernail modification, piercing, lip plates, tattooing, braiding, and headgear.

Cultures, subcultures, and institutions
Groups who practice adornment include the Yakuza, military, religious institutions, tribal groups, and the punk culture.
Items of adornment can tell us about a person's rank, social status, gender role, area of origin, etc. An example would be the beaded jewelry worn by the Maasai tribe, which is very specific to them and some related tribes.

Images

See also
 Fashion accessory
 Body modification
 Native American jewelry

References

Further reading
 Kniel, N; Wright, T:Ribbon: The Art of Adornment, press, 
 Boucher, François:20,000 Years of Fashion: The History of Costume and Personal Adornment, H.N. Abrams, 1987.
 White, Carolyn L.:American Artifacts of Personal Adornment, 1680-1820:A Guide to Identification and Interpretation, Altamira Press, 2005, 
 Bouchot, Henri:The Printed Book, Its History, Illustration, and Adornment, from the Days of Gutenberg to the Present Time, General Books, 2010, 
Gurel, Lois M., Beeson, Marianne S.:Dimensions of dress and adornment: a book of readings, Kendall/Hunt Pub. Co., 1979.

External links
 Examples of African adornment
 

Fashion
Body modification
History of clothing